With the advice and consent of the United States Senate, the president of the United States appoints the members of the Supreme Court of the United States, which is the highest court of the federal judiciary of the United States. Following his victory in the 2020 presidential election, Democrat Joe Biden took office as president on January 20, 2021. During the 2020 Democratic primary campaign, Biden pledged to appoint a Black woman to the Supreme Court, although unlike his opponent, Donald Trump, Biden did not release a specific list of potential nominees during the 2020 general election campaign.

In February 2022, Biden selected Judge Ketanji Brown Jackson to replace Justice Stephen Breyer, who retired at the end of the court's 2022 term.

Court composition under Biden

Nomination of Ketanji Brown Jackson

On January 26, 2022, it was reported that Justice Stephen Breyer planned to step down at the end of the court's current term, giving Biden his first opportunity to name a justice to the court. On January 27, Biden reiterated his intention to keep his campaign promise to nominate a Black woman. On February 22, it was reported that Biden had met with his top three contenders, Ketanji Brown Jackson, J. Michelle Childs and Leondra Kruger. On February 25, it was announced that Biden would nominate Judge Jackson. On April 7, 2022, Jackson was confirmed by a vote of 53–47. She was then sworn in on June 30, 2022 at noon, when Breyer's retirement went into effect.

Names mentioned as likely nominees
Following is a list of individuals who have been mentioned in various news accounts as possible nominees for a Supreme Court appointment under Biden:

Note: Individuals marked with an asterisk would fulfill Biden's commitment that his first nominee be a Black woman.

Bolded individuals have been selected by Biden for the Supreme Court.

United States Courts of Appeals

 Court of Appeals for the D.C. Circuit
 Ketanji Brown Jackson* (born 1970) (elevated by Biden) (nominated and confirmed)
 Sri Srinivasan (born 1967) 
 J. Michelle Childs* (born 1966) (elevated by Biden) 
 Court of Appeals for the 2nd Circuit
 Eunice C. Lee* (born 1970) (appointed by Biden)
 Alison Nathan (born 1972) (elevated by Biden)
 Court of Appeals for the 3rd Circuit
 Arianna J. Freeman* (born 1978) (appointed by Biden)
 Tamika Montgomery-Reeves* (born 1981) (appointed by Biden)
 Court of Appeals for the 7th Circuit
 Candace Jackson-Akiwumi* (born 1979) (appointed by Biden)
 Court of Appeals for the 9th Circuit
 Michelle Friedland (born 1972)
 Lucy Koh (born 1968) (elevated by Biden)
 Jacqueline Nguyen (born 1965)
 Holly A. Thomas* (born 1979) (appointed by Biden)
 Paul J. Watford (born 1967)
 Court of Appeals for the Federal Circuit
 Tiffany P. Cunningham* (born 1976) (appointed by Biden)
 Todd M. Hughes (born 1966)

United States District Courts
 Leslie Abrams Gardner* (born 1974) – Judge of the Middle District of Georgia
 J. Paul Oetken (born 1965) – Judge of the Southern District of New York
 Wilhelmina Wright* (born 1964) – Judge of the District of Minnesota and former Associate Justice of the Minnesota Supreme Court

State Supreme Courts
 Cheri Beasley* (born 1966) – former Chief Justice of the North Carolina Supreme Court
 Anita Earls* (born 1960) – Associate Justice of the North Carolina Supreme Court
 Mariano-Florentino Cuéllar (born 1972) — former Associate Justice of the California Supreme Court
 Leondra Kruger* (born 1976) – Associate Justice of the California Supreme Court
 Goodwin Liu (born 1970) – Associate Justice of the California Supreme Court
 Maite Oronoz Rodríguez (born 1976) – Chief Justice of the Supreme Court of Puerto Rico

State government officials
 Stacey Abrams* (born 1973) – former Minority Leader of the Georgia House of Representatives and 2018 nominee for Governor of Georgia
 Keisha Lance Bottoms* (born 1970) – former Mayor of Atlanta
 Letitia James* (born 1958) – Attorney General of New York

Academics
 Michelle Alexander* (born 1967) – author and civil rights advocate
 Danielle Holley-Walker* (born c. 1975) – dean of the Howard University School of Law
 Pamela S. Karlan (born 1959) – professor of law at Stanford Law School
 Melissa Murray* (born 1975), professor of law at New York University School of Law
 L. Song Richardson* (born 1966–67), president of Colorado College
 Kenji Yoshino (born 1969) – professor of constitutional law at New York University School of Law

Executive branch 
 Kristen Clarke* (born 1975) – Assistant Attorney General for the Civil Rights Division

Other fields 
 Nancy Abudu* (born 1974) – deputy legal director and interim director for strategic litigation at the Southern Poverty Law Center (nominated to Eleventh Circuit by Biden)
 Sherrilyn Ifill* (born 1962) – director-counsel of the NAACP Legal Defense and Educational Fund

See also
 Judicial appointment history for United States federal courts
 List of federal judges appointed by Joe Biden
 United States federal judge

References

Supreme Court candidates
United States Supreme Court candidates by president